Long Day's Journey into Night is a 1962 American drama film directed by Sidney Lumet, adapted from Eugene O'Neill's Pulitzer-winning play of the same name. It stars Katharine Hepburn, Ralph Richardson, Jason Robards, and Dean Stockwell. The story deals with themes of addiction and the resulting dysfunction of the nuclear family, and is drawn from O'Neill's own experiences. It was shot at Chelsea Studios in New York, with exteriors filmed on City Island.

The film won Best Actor (for Richardson) and Best Actress (for Hepburn) at the Cannes Film Festival and was named by the National Board of Review as one of the Top Ten Films of 1962. Hepburn’s performance earned her an Oscar and Golden Globe nomination for Best Actress.

O’Neill’s play was adapted to film again in 1996, directed by David Wellington.

Plot

The film is a direct translation of O’Neill’s stage play, without any major cuts or changes to the source material.

Cast
 Katharine Hepburn as Mary Tyrone
 Ralph Richardson as James Tyrone Sr.
 Jason Robards as Jamie Tyrone
 Dean Stockwell as Edmund Tyrone
 Jeanne Burr as Cathleen

Production

Development 
Producer Ely Landau did a version of The Iceman Cometh for TV. This impressed the widow of Eugene O'Neill enough for her to give him the screen rights to Long Day's Journey. The cast and director formed a cooperative and agreed to work for a lower fee in exchange for a percentage of the profits.

Casting 
Jason Robards was the only actor from the stage version to also star in the film, he had won the Tony Award for Best Featured Actor in a Play for playing Jamie Tyrone in the 1957 Broadway staging, and reprised the part in O’Neill’s sequel A Moon for the Misbegotten. He later played James Tyrone in several productions of the play.

Marlon Brando was offered the role of Jamie, but turned it down.

Filming 
The film was reportedly shot for $435,000 over 37 days, two days over schedule. The entire film was shot in-sequence, after three weeks of rehearsals. Lumet later wrote that the total budget was $490,000. Exteriors were shot at a house on City Island in the Bronx, and interiors were on sets at Chelsea Television Studios in Manhattan.

Release
Joseph E. Levine bought the film for distribution, but said he lost money on it. "You cannot stay in business by making O'Neill pictures", he said. Lumet later wrote that "there actually were some profits."

Critical reception
The film has received critical acclaim. Rotten Tomatoes gives a score of 94% based on 17 reviews, with an average score of 8.2/10. Critics regularly praised Lumet's direction and Hepburn's performance.

Dwight MacDonald from Esquire magazine, wrote of the film "In his screen version of Eugene O’Neill’s Long Day’s Journey Into Night, Sidney Lumet has given us a superb cinematic translation of the only American play to which the much-abused adjective “great” can seriously be applied." When speaking of Hepburn's performance he said "I have never been an addict of Katharine Hepburn; she struck me usually as mannered, to say the least; but here, stimulated by O’Neill and Lumet, she emerges as a superb tragédienne." Bosley Crowther of The New York Times said that "Under the direction of Sidney Lumet, they charge the place with electricity. That is, on the whole they do so. They develop an overall sense of deep disquiet within the passionate individuals and an acrid air of smoldering savagery." And when commenting on Hepburn's performance he stated "In the moments of deepest anguish, she is vibrant with hot and tragic truth, an eloquent representatation of a lovely woman brought to feeble, helpless ruin."

Awards and nominations

See also
 List of American films of 1962

References

External links

 
 
 
 

1962 films
1962 drama films
1960s English-language films
American black-and-white films
American drama films
Films scored by André Previn
Films about alcoholism
Films about dysfunctional families
American films based on plays
Films based on works by Eugene O'Neill
Films directed by Sidney Lumet
Films produced by Ely Landau
Films set in Connecticut
Films set in 1912
Films shot in New York City
1960s American films